Antony Thachuparambil (8 December 1894 – 9 June 1963), popularly known as the Missionary of Chelakkara was an Indian Syro-Malabar Catholic priest and social reformer who worked in Chelakkara, Thrissur District, Kerala, India. A candidate for sainthood, he was declared a Servant of God by the Holy See in 2009.

Early years 
Antony Thachuparambil was born on 8 December 1894 in Kottat, a suburban village of Chalakudy in Kerala to Poulose and Rosa. He had his early schooling in Chalakudy Government High School and college education in St. Joseph's College, Tiruchirappalli. He continued his pastoral education at Mary Matha Major Seminary, Thrissur and was ordained on 22 Dec 1924.

Social career 
Thachuparambil started his career in 1928 as the first Chaplain of Chelakkara, a backward forest area in Thrissur. There, he worked among the poor and he built St. Mary's Forane Church, a school for girls (Little Flower Girls High School), a destitute home for children which was later renamed Fr. Antony Balabhavan, a convent for nuns, Little Flower Convent  and a health clinic which later grew to become Jeevodaya Mission Hospital.

Canonization 
Thachuparambil is said to be credited with several miracles which are being considered and verified by Roman Catholic Church. His contributions for the overall development of Chelakkara, reportedly irrespective of the caste, creed or colour, were considered by the Roman Catholic Church when deciding upon initiation of his canonization process. Paul Pulikkan was appointed the postulator and as the first step towards canonization, Antony Thachuparambil was declared Servant of God by the Roman Catholic Church on 9 December 2009. In December 2020, the diocese court completed the formalities and prepared an 8090-page document detailing the priest's life and works, to be submitted to the Holy See.

In the media 
Shalom Television aired a documentary on the life of Thachuparambil as an episode under their series, Saints Town in 2015.

See also 
 George Vakayil
 Mathew Kavukattu

References

External links
 
 
 

1894 births
1963 deaths
Eastern Catholic Servants of God
People from Chalakudy
Indian Eastern Catholics
Syro-Malabar priests
20th-century venerated Christians
Indian social reformers
20th-century Indian educational theorists
Indian Servants of God
Christian clergy from Kerala